Aik Hai Nigar is a Pakistani television biographical-drama film based on three-star general of Pakistan Army, Nigar Johar and centers on her life and career from 1975 (when Johar was young) to present time. The telefilm is directed by Adnan Sarwar, written by Umera Ahmad and first aired on ARY Digital on 23 October 2021. The telefilm marked the Mahira Khan's debut as a producer, who also played the titular role in the film. It also stars Bilal Ashraf in his television debut as Johar's husband. The telefilm was well-received by the audience and received mixed reviews from critics.

Plot
Nigar Johar is a girl who aspires to be big. Even though she has to face hardships of misogyny and personal despair, Nigar is determined to achieve her goal in life. Along the journey, she meets her life partner Johar Ali Khan who encourages her to pursue her career goal and make history.

Cast
 Mahira Khan as Nigar Johar
 Bilal Ashraf as Johar Ali Khan, Nigar's Husband
 Khushhal Khan as Shahid, Nigar's Brother
 Sohail Sameer as Nigar's Father
 Dr Sarah Nadeem as Nigar’s mother 
 Anoushey Rania Khan as young Nigar
 Tauqeer Nasir as Qamar Javed Bajwa
 Iman Shahid

Soundtrack 
The music of the telefilm is composed by Haroon Shahid while Abbas Ali Khan is the music Producer.

Reception 
On television broadcast, the telefilm received 5.2 TRPs at its timeslot.

The telefilm mostly received positive reviews from critics, with major praise towards the acting performances. While reviewing the telefilm, Cutacut wrote, "Despite strong performances by lead actors, Aik Hai Nigar fell short with its narrative." Express Tribune criticized the film's narrative and shallow depiction on Johar's life stating, "the film lacks severely in the narrative department, which couldn’t have been salvaged by the cast even if they tried".

Accolades

References

External links 

Pakistani biographical drama films
2021 films
Films directed by Adnan Sarwar